Camelia Ethel MacDonald (24 February 1909 – 1 December 1960) was a Glasgow-based Scottish anarchist, activist, and 1937, Spanish Civil War broadcaster on pro-Republican, anti-Fascist Barcelona radio.

Early years

Camelia Ethel McDonald was born on 24 February 1909 in Bellshill, Scotland, to Andrew McDonald, a coach painter, and Daisy Watts. A native of North Lanarkshire, Ethel MacDonald, the fifth of nine children, left home at 16, joined the Independent Labour Party (ILP) and worked at various jobs. In 1925 she met Guy Aldred and, with him, became politically active in the Anti-Parliamentary Communist Federation (APCF). In 1933 she accepted his invitation to work as his secretary, and joined him in the June 1934 formation of the United Socialist Movement (USM). During this time she became fluent in French and German.

Spanish Civil War
In November 1936 MacDonald travelled to Barcelona with Guy Aldred's partner, Jenny Patrick, to represent and show the support of the Scottish anarchist movement for the Republican faction in the Spanish Civil War. In January 1937 she began to transmit regular English-language reports on the war on Barcelona's widely heard Anarchist radio station run by the National Confederation of Labor (CNT).

In the crackdown following the events of May 1937 she assisted the escape of anarchists wanted by the Communist secret police and smuggled into prison letters and food for fellow anarchists held by regional authorities. Through her activities in helping anarchists escape Spain, she became renowned in the British press as the "Scots Scarlet Pimpernel". Between July and November 1937, she was a national figure in the newspapers, with daily reports and inquiries as to her whereabouts and activities.

Death of Bob Smillie
On 12 June 1937, Bob Smillie, who was a member of the Independent Labour Party that had been fighting with the POUM forces for the Republicans, died while being held by the Valencia police. The police stated that his death had been caused by peritonitis, however, rumours flew around Valencia that he had been beaten to death. MacDonald began reporting the latter version of events on her radio broadcasts and in newspaper articles. This eventually led to her own arrest.

MacDonald eventually escaped custody and left Spain altogether, making her way back to Glasgow by November 1937. Along the way she travelled through Paris and Amsterdam, where she denounced the actions of the Communists in Spain. She continued to publicly discuss the case of Bob Smillie, but her version of events was disputed in the UK by David Murray, a member of the Independent Labour Party who had also been in Spain. Murray insisted that Smillie had died of peritonitis, and he was generally believed until George Orwell returned to London in 1938 and also began to denounce the actions of the Communists in Spain. Georges Kopp, who had been Smillie's commander in Spain, also returned and supported the view that Smillie had been murdered.

Later years and death
After her return from Spain, Ethel MacDonald worked closely with Guy Aldred, Jenny Patrick, John Taylor Caldwell and other Glasgow anarchists on a shoestring publishing enterprise, The Strickland Press, which published regular issues of the USM organ, The Word. They continued their activities through World War II and the 1950s peace movement, with MacDonald considered as the unofficial manager, bookkeeper and printer of The Strickland Press.

She and Guy Aldred donated their papers to the Mitchell Library in Glasgow. The collection numbers approximately 500 items consisting of Spanish newspapers, bulletins, newssheets, flyers, posters, pamphlets and photographs issued under the auspices of the CNT and the Iberian Anarchist Federation during 1936–1938.

Ethel MacDonald was diagnosed with multiple sclerosis in February 1958 and lost her ability to speak. Within three years she died in Glasgow's Knightswood Hospital at the age of 51.

References

Notes

Citations

Sources

Film
 Ethel MacDonald - An Anarchist Story by Mark Littlewood

External links
 Biography by John Couzin: "Life story of one of Glasgow's women anarchists that I feel very strongly is worth remembering."
 The Volunteer Ban - speech given by Ethel MacDonald on Radio Barcelona and subsequently published in Regeneración (1937).
 Ethel MacDonald Entry in the Daily Bleed
 Ethel MacDonald Collection at Mitchell Library, Glasgow

Scottish anarchists
Scottish activists
People from Motherwell
People from Bellshill
British people of the Spanish Civil War
Scottish essayists
Scottish women essayists
1909 births
1960 deaths
Deaths from multiple sclerosis
Neurological disease deaths in Scotland
Women in the Spanish Civil War
Anarchism in Scotland
20th-century essayists